Yamuna is a 2013 Tamil drama film directed by E. V. Ganeshbabu, and starring Sathya, Sri Ramya, Aadukalam Naren and Vinodhini Vaidyanathan.

Plot
Bhaskar (Sathya) is a nomad with a happy-go-lucky attitude and plays the usual lad with no big intentions however always surrounded by a bunch of like-minded friends. The usual friendship elements and fancy jokes among guys is their daily agenda, however Bhaskar's relationship with his father is rotten and he is constantly mocked for his attitude. Enter the lady of the hour Yamuna (Sri Ramya) the girl who makes any guy to fall in love almost instantly.

Cast

 Sathya as Bhaskar
 Sri Ramya as Yamuna
 Vinodhini Vaidyanathan as Chandrika
 Aadukalam Naren
 Bala Singh
 Chaams as Punniyakkodi
 Pasanga Sivakumar
 TSK as Chinnamani
 Athullia D'couth as Malathi
 E. V. Ganeshbabu in a Special appearance
 Reyan Khan as Rahman
 Shifa (special appearance)

Casting
Sathya is the first student from Balu Mahendra's film institute got opportunity to act as Hero. Sri Ramya is a Telugu actress got Nandhi Award for 1940 Lo Oka Gramam.

Soundtrack
Soundtrack was composed by Elakkiyan, with lyrics by Vairamuthu.
 "Ottrai Panithuli" - Prasanna, Sainthavi
 "Oru Ponnapparu" - Rahul Nambiar, Sam P.Keerthan
 "Mannai Nambalaam" - Sam P. Keerthan
 "Dimba Dimba" - M. M. Manasi
 "Oh Nenje" - Haricharan
 "Oru Koottu Puzhu" - Padmalatha

References

2013 films
2010s Tamil-language films